Velika Reka is a village in Serbia. It is situated in the Mali Zvornik municipality, in the Mačva District of Central Serbia. The village has a Serb ethnic majority with a population of 476 (2002 census).

Historical population

1948: 661
1953: 721
1961: 680
1971: 652
1981: 472
1991: 521
2002: 476

References

See also
List of places in Serbia

Populated places in Mačva District